The 2015 Burgenland state election was held on 31 May 2015 to elect the members of the 21st Landtag of Burgenland.

The two major parties, the governing Social Democratic Party of Austria (SPÖ) and Austrian People's Party (ÖVP), both lost votes. The three minor parties made gains and each doubled their representation in the Landtag.

With the SPÖ falling substantially short of a majority, they required a coalition partner to govern. They subsequently formed a coalition with the Freedom Party of Austria (FPÖ), violating the party's federal directive not to work with FPÖ in government. The decision was subject to backlash and protests, but the coalition took office regardless.

Background
In the 2010 election, the SPÖ won 48.3% of votes and fell one seat short of an absolute majority. They thus negotiated a working agreement with the ÖVP.

Prior to amendments made in 2014, the Burgenland constitution mandated that cabinet positions in the state government be allocated between parties proportionally in accordance with the share of votes won by each; this is known as Proporz. As such, the government was a perpetual coalition of all parties that qualified for at least one cabinet position. In December 2014, the SPÖ and ÖVP voted to amend the constitution to remove this requirement. As such, the 2015 election was the first in post-war Burgenland history in which conventional coalition formation could take place.

Electoral system
The 36 seats of the Landtag of Burgenland are elected via open list proportional representation in a two-step process. The seats are distributed between seven multi-member constituencies, corresponding to the seven districts of Burgenland (the statutory cities of Eisenstadt and Rust are combined with Eisenstadt-Umgebung District). Apportionment of the seats is based on the results of the most recent census.

For parties to receive any representation in the Landtag, they must either win at least one seat in a constituency directly, or clear a 4 percent state-wide electoral threshold. Seats are distributed in constituencies according to the Hare quota, with any remaining seats allocated using the D'Hondt method at the state level, to ensure overall proportionality between a party's vote share and its share of seats.

In addition to voting for a political party, voters may cast preferential votes for specific candidates of that party, but are not required to do so. These additional votes do not affect the proportional allocation based on the vote for the party or list, but can change the rank order of candidates on a party's lists at the state and constituency level. Voters may cast one preferential vote at the state level, or three at the constituency level. A voter may not cross party-lines to cast a preference vote for a candidate of another party; such preference votes are invalid.

Contesting parties

In addition to the parties already represented in the Landtag, four parties collected enough signatures to be placed on the ballot.

 NEOS – The New Austria and Liberal Forum (NEOS)
 Christian Party of Austria (CPÖ)

Opinion polling

Results

Results by constituency

Preference votes
Alongside votes for a party, voters were able to cast a preferential votes for a candidate on the party list. The ten candidates with the most preferential votes on a state level were as follows:

References

Burgenland
State elections in Austria